The 1999 Open Gaz de France singles was the singles event of the seventh edition of the Open GDF Suez; a WTA Tier II tournament held in Paris, France. Mary Pierce was the defending champion but did not compete that year.

Serena Williams won in the final 6–2, 3–6, 7–6(7–4) against Amélie Mauresmo. It was her first career singles title.

Seeds
The top four seeds received a bye to the second round.

Draw

Finals

Top half

Bottom half

Qualifying

Seeds

Qualifiers

Lucky losers

Qualifying draw

First qualifier

Second qualifier

Third qualifier

Fourth qualifier

External links
 ITF tournament draws

Open GDF Suez
Open Gaz de France